Love, Laughs and Lather is a 1917 American short comedy film featuring Harold Lloyd.

Cast
 Harold Lloyd - Lonesome Luke
 Snub Pollard
 Bebe Daniels
 Gilbert Pratt
 Gus Leonard
 Fred C. Newmeyer
 Billy Fay
 Nina Speight
 Bud Jamison
 Charles Stevenson - (as Charles E. Stevenson)
 Dorothea Wolbert
 May Ballard - (as Mabel Ballard)
 Evelyn Page
 W.L. Adams
 Sammy Brooks
 Max Hamburger
 John Christian
 Harry Rindfleish
 David Voorhees
 Bud Zelofer
 Fred Jefferson
 Marie Mosquini
 Margaret Joslin - (as Margaret Joslin Todd)

See also
 Harold Lloyd filmography

References

External links

1917 films
1917 short films
American silent short films
1917 comedy films
American black-and-white films
Silent American comedy films
Lonesome Luke films
American comedy short films
1910s American films